Sigmodontomys is a genus of rodent in the tribe Oryzomyini of family Cricetidae. It is related to Nectomys and Melanomys and used to be included in Nectomys. It includes two species, Sigmodontomys alfari and the much rarer Sigmodontomys aphrastus, but whether these are indeed each other's closest relatives is uncertain.

References

Literature cited
Musser, G.G. and Carleton, M.D. 2005. Superfamily Muroidea. Pp. 894–1531 in Wilson, D.E. and Reeder, D.M. (eds.). Mammal Species of the World: a taxonomic and geographic reference. 3rd ed. Baltimore: The Johns Hopkins University Press, 2 vols., 2142 pp. 
Weksler, M. 2006. Phylogenetic relationships of oryzomyine rodents (Muroidea: Sigmodontinae): separate and combined analyses of morphological and molecular data. Bulletin of the American Museum of Natural History 296:1–149.

 
Rodent genera
Taxa named by Joel Asaph Allen
Taxonomy articles created by Polbot